Eric Robinson "Cowboy" Pettinger (December 14, 1904 in Bradford, England, United Kingdom — December 24, 1968) was a British-born Canadian professional ice hockey player. Pettinger played 98 games in the National Hockey League (NHL) with the Ottawa Senators, Toronto Maple Leafs, and Boston Bruins between 1928 and 1931. The rest of his career, which lasted from 1923 to 1937, was spent in various minor leagues. Pettinger is the brother of fellow NHL player Gord Pettinger.

Playing career
As a child, Pettinger's family moved to Regina, Saskatchewan. Pettinger started junior hockey in the Southern Saskatchewan Junior Hockey League with the Regina Pats, competing in three Memorial Cup finals. In 1922, Pettinger joined the Regina Victorias of the Southern Saskatchewan Senior Hockey League, playing there for five seasons. With the Victorias, Pettinger competed in two Allan Cup finals before joining the Manitoba-Thunder Bay Hockey League's Fort William Forts in 1926. After one season in Fort William, Pettinger signed as a free agent with the New York Rangers. Pettinger never joined the Rangers, as his rights were traded a month later to the Toronto Maple Leafs, then two months later traded to Boston, all while playing in Fort William.

Pettinger joined the Bruins for the 1928-29 season, only to be traded once again, this time to the Maple Leafs. Pettinger played one season with the Leafs before being traded to Ottawa as part of the King Clancy deal. Pettinger played in only 13 games with the Senators before he was dealt to the International Hockey League's London Panthers. Pettinger would not return to the NHL, playing with London for five years, before stints with the International-American Hockey League (IAHL)'s Cleveland Barons, the Pacific Coast Hockey League's Portland Buckaroos and the IAHL's Pittsburgh Hornets.

When the Stanley Cup was redone during the 1957–58 season, Pettinger's name was added to the Stanley Cup as a 1929 Boston Bruin, despite being ineligible. Pettinger was a member of the Toronto Maple Leafs the day Boston won the Stanley Cup.

Career statistics

Regular season and playoffs

Awards and honours
IHL First All-Star Team (1936)
Source: Hockey Hall of Fame

Transactions
September, 1927 - Signed as a free agent by New York Rangers
October, 1927 - Rights traded to Toronto by New York Rangers for the rights to Yip Foster
December 21, 1927 - Rights traded to Boston by Toronto with $15,000 for Jimmy Herbert
January 10, 1929 - Traded to Toronto by Boston with the rights to Hugh Plaxton for the rights to George Owen
October 11, 1930 - Traded to Ottawa by Toronto with Art Smith and $35,000 for King Clancy
October 31, 1932 - Traded to London (IHL) by Ottawa for cash

Source: Hockey Hall of Fame

See also
List of National Hockey League players from the United Kingdom

External links

1904 births
1968 deaths
Boston Bruins players
Canadian ice hockey players
Cleveland Falcons players
English emigrants to Canada
Ice hockey people from Saskatchewan
London Tecumsehs players
Ottawa Senators (1917) players
Sportspeople from Regina, Saskatchewan
Pittsburgh Hornets players
Portland Buckaroos players
Regina Pats players
Stanley Cup champions
Toronto Maple Leafs players